NetGenie is a wireless router that offers security and protection against internet and network threats. It is a part of the Cyberoam's product portfolio and was launched in 2011.

Product Range  
Considering the product range, NetGenie offers 4 basic products, two for HOME users and two for SOHO users. The appliance available for the HOME users are NG11VH and NG11EH  and the appliance available for the SOHO users are NG11VO and NG11EO.

NG11VH 
NG11VH is a Wireless VDSL2 /ADSL2+ Modem Router and Supports VDSL2, ADSL2+, Cable Internet, 3G USB modem connections.

NG11EH 
NG11EH model is a Multi-Device Wi-Fi Security, parental control,  Security, 3G ready, Threat-free Wi-Fi, Reports, Remote Management and more. NG11EH have in-depth parental control that comprises facility for  blocking Unsafe/Adult Internet Control (under lists of pornography, Spyware, nudity), security coverage for all connected devices (Including laptops, desktops, iPads, iPhones), Age-Appropriate Internet Access for Kids, List of pre-categorized websites and applications with regular updates, Customizable Internet Access and Reports on Online Activities for all relevant information about security on kids’ /users Internet activities such as – websites visited, online applications used, attempts to visit blocked websites and more – with its logs and reports.

NG11VO 
NG11VO is a Wireless VDSL2/ADSL2+ Integrated Security Appliance for small offices. It supports VDSL2, ADSL2+, Cable Internet, 3G USB modem connections.  NG11VO have advanced Internet controls to manage employees’ time and productivity. NG11VO preconfigured security against unauthorized access and misuse of office Wi-Fi network protecting users against legal liabilities and data loss.

NG11EO  
NG11EO is for small offices or home offices which can be managed through a web-based GUI, available over any Internet-access device within the office network. The appliance have features like Security, VPN, 3G ready, Internal controls, Pre-configured Wi-Fi Security, Reports, and Remote Management.

See also 
 Wireless router
 Unified Threat Management
 Network Security

References

External links 
 NetGenie - Official Website
 Cyberoam - Official Website

Networking hardware
Wireless networking
Routers (computing)
Computer storage companies
Content-control software